Michael Wardrope (born 17 December 1996) is a Scottish footballer who plays as a midfielder for Hurlford United.

A native of Ardrossan (though born in Irvine), he came through the Ayr United's academy system and made his debut in April 2013 in a match against Arbroath. He spent the 2014–15 season on loan at New Cumnock-based Junior side, Glenafton Athletic. After four years with Ayr United, Wardrope left the club in June 2017 to sign for Kilwinning Rangers.

On 21 June 2019 Wardrope has signed for Hurlford United.

On 22 March 2022, Auchinleck Talbot announced they had signed Wardrope from local rivals Irvine Meadow XI.

Career statistics

Last update: 10 July 2016

References

1996 births
Living people
Association football midfielders
Ayr United F.C. players
Glenafton Athletic F.C. players
Kilwinning Rangers F.C. players
Scottish Football League players
Scottish footballers
Scottish Junior Football Association players
Scottish Professional Football League players
Footballers from Irvine, North Ayrshire
West of Scotland Football League players